Pablo Pauly (born 24 January 1991) is a French actor.

Theater

Filmography

References

External links 

1991 births
Living people
French male film actors